Operation: Fastpass is a 1983 role-playing game adventure for Top Secret published by TSR.

Plot summary
Operation: Fastpass is an espionage mission in which the agent team is to attend a puzzle convention in Hungary and assist a top Soviet scientist and puzzle expert in defecting to the West.

Reception
Nick Davison reviewed Operation: Fastpass for Imagine magazine and stated that "Overall [...] an interesting scenario for players and GMs alike."

Kevin Allen reviewed Operation: Fastpass in Space Gamer No. 70. Allen commented that "This is the best, and closest to the genre, of the Top Secret modules yet. It's comprehensive and flexible, and a great challenge for any would-be superspy. One personal comment: I wouldn't take novice agents into this one; a minimum of second or third level, with several missions under the belt, should be required."

References

Role-playing game supplements introduced in 1983
Top Secret (role-playing game) adventures